Bhagian is a village in Batala in Gurdaspur district of Punjab State, India. The village is administrated by Sarpanch an elected representative of the village.

See also
List of villages in India

References 

Villages in Gurdaspur district